Season 1884–85 was the tenth season in which Heart of Midlothian competed at a Scottish national level, entering the Scottish Cup for the tenth time.

Overview 
Hearts entered the Scottish Cup at the second round winning their match against Dunfermline. Hearts should have proceeded to the third round but were disqualified for professionalism.

Later that season Hearts reached the fourth round of the Edinburgh Shield losing to Rival Hibernian.

Results

Scottish Cup

Edinburgh Shield

Rosebery Charity Cup

See also
List of Heart of Midlothian F.C. seasons

References 

 Statistical Record 84-85

External links 
 Official Club website

Heart of Midlothian F.C. seasons
Hearts